Raindance is an independent film festival and film school that operates in major cities including London, Los Angeles, New York, Vancouver, Toronto, Montreal, Budapest, Berlin, and Brussels. The festival was established in 1992 by Elliot Grove to be the voice of British filmmaking, and it showcases features and shorts by filmmakers from around the world to an audience of film executives and buyers, journalists, film fans and filmmakers.

In 2013, the festival was listed by Variety as one of the world's top 50 "unmissable film festivals".

Timeline 
1992 – Raindance is founded. Film training courses are offered.
1993 – The Raindance Film Festival is launched, World premiere of What's Eating Gilbert Grape.
1994 – Pulp Fiction makes its UK debut at Raindance.
1998 – Raindance creates the British Independent Film Awards which celebrate the achievements of independent British filmmaking.
2000 – Christopher Nolan's Memento has its UK premiere at Raindance.
2003 – Raindance launches the world's first 15 Second Shorts Competition with Nokia.
2004 – The Independent Film Trust is launched by Raindance: a charity that supports independent filmmaking and provides bursaries and training for the disadvantaged, from children in inner-city schools to refugees and the mentally ill.
2008 – Raindance Screens Once, which goes on to win the Academy Award for Best Song.
2009 – Down Terrace, Ben Wheatley's first film, debuts at Raindance.

2012 – Short films which play at Raindance become eligible for Oscar nominations.
2013 – Raindance launches Raw Talent and produces its film Love.Honour.Obey.
2015 – Raindance launches 360/VR Storytelling training.
 
2016 – Raindance launches the Auteur Award and presents the inaugural prize to Ken Loach.
2016 – Raindance launches the VRX Awards and Showcase.

2017 – Raindance hands the 2nd Annual Auteur Award to Guy Ritchie, describing him as a "prominent figure" who breathed "new life into the British film industry" with his "cult crime comedies."
2017 – Raindance celebrated its 25th anniversary.

2018 – Raindance hands the 3rd Annual Auteur Award to Terry Gilliam, saying that for four decades, he's been "magicking amazing visual stories from practically nowhere."

References

External links 
 
 

Film festivals in England
Film festivals established in 1992
Film schools in England